Patrick de Lange (born 21 January 1976 in Amsterdam) is a Dutch baseball player.

De Lange represented the Netherlands at the 2000 Summer Olympics in Sydney where he and his team became fifth. Four years later at the 2004 Summer Olympics in Athens they were sixth.

External links
De Lange at the Dutch Olympic Archive

1976 births
Living people
Baseball players at the 2000 Summer Olympics
Baseball players at the 2004 Summer Olympics
Dutch baseball players
Olympic baseball players of the Netherlands
Sportspeople from Amsterdam